Arunas Bruno Vasys (born August 18, 1943) is a Lithuanian-born former American football linebacker who played three seasons with the Philadelphia Eagles of the National Football League (NFL). He was drafted by the Eagles in the sixteenth round of the 1966 NFL Draft. He played college football at the University of Notre Dame and attended St. Philip High School in Chicago, Illinois.

References

External links
Just Sports Stats

1943 births
Living people
American football linebackers
Soviet emigrants to the United States
Lithuanian players of American football
Notre Dame Fighting Irish football players
Philadelphia Eagles players
Players of American football from Chicago